Vivian Flowers is a state legislator in Arkansas. She serves in the Arkansas House of Representatives and is a Democrat. She is a graduate of the University of Arkansas. She lives in Pine Bluff, Arkansas.

She made a statement for the 50th anniversary of the Arkansas ACLU applauding its work and noting "Our rights are under attack."

She and another politician who is African American were involved in an incident where police were called and a complaint filed in 2020. She has called for various police reforms after the incident. She has represented Districts 17 and 65 in the Arkansas House since 2015.

References

Women state legislators in Arkansas
Year of birth missing (living people)
Living people
Democratic Party members of the Arkansas House of Representatives
21st-century American politicians
21st-century American women politicians